Perth marshalling yard (also known as Perth Yard) was a railway marshalling yard to the immediate west of Perth railway station in Perth, Western Australia and east of West Perth railway station.

The origins and development of the yard can be seen in considerations of the 1899 Royal Commission into the early stages of city railway traffic and the related joint select committee on the bridges over William Street (the Horseshoe Bridge) and Melbourne Road (which did not eventuate).

It can also be considered to be the railway land between the Horseshoe Bridge and the West Perth subway.

It preceded the Leighton and Forrestfield railway yards, and was in use until the development of the Forrestfield yard in the 1970s.

The marshalling yard included access to the Perth Metropolitan Markets and other adjacent industrial sites.

Most newspaper reports about the yard during its active years tended to be about accidents.

Operationally, because of the proximity of the Perth railway station, a number of signal boxes were required to facilitate traffic into the yard and the interaction with regular services on the Fremantle railway line, as well as the Perth station until the reduction of services in the 1970s.

The land occupied by the marshalling yard is now part of the Perth City Link project.

Notes

Perth City Link
Former buildings and structures in Perth, Western Australia
Rail yards in Australia